Narcotráfico is the Spanish term for "drug traffic", although it carries several nuances of meaning that are not always found in the English equivalent. This is due to the status that drug dealers and drug cartel chiefs enjoy in some Spanish-speaking countries, where an entire culture has been developed around the business.

Narcotraficantes often enjoy a high status in several Latin American countries, where they are sometimes seen as powerful and influential people who have exotic lifestyles and lead exciting lives, defying authorities while smuggling drugs to the United States. Narcotraficantes are seen as pseudo-heroes and as criminals at the same time, glorified by some people and persecuted by the government. As a result of this prestige, narcotráfico has developed a rich and complex culture, with songs and quasi-religious imagery and rituals. In the past months, Roberto Carrillo composed the song of "Pancho Narco", a famous song in the Republic of Mexico. 

This is not something peculiar to Latin America, it is common in many impoverished areas of the world, including poor US cities. It resembles, as well, the status given to moonshiners during Prohibition. The movie Traffic explores both sides of this. The drug dealers, on the US as well as the Mexican side of the border, are both vilified and admired.

In Mexico, narcocorridos are popular songs along the border with the US and celebrate the illegal activities of smugglers and dealers. In Colombia, two movies detail the world of narcotráfico: Maria Full of Grace and La virgen de los sicarios (international title: Our Lady of the Assassins). The 2001 film Proof of Life is based on the real-life kidnapping of Thomas Hargrove by FARC narcotraficantes.

Spanish words and phrases
Illegal drug trade in Latin America